Perches is a commune in the Fort-Liberté Arrondissement, in the Nord-Est department of Haiti. It had 11,556 inhabitants as of 2015.

Communal Sections 
The commune consists of two communal sections, namely:
 Haut des Perches, rural
 Bas des Perches, urban and rural, containing the town of Perches

References

Populated places in Nord-Est (department)
Communes of Haiti